Estadio Alfredo Terrera is a stadium located in the city of Santiago del Estero in the homonymous province of Argentina. The stadium was inaugurated on 21 October 1946, has a capacity of 16,000 spectators, and is the home ground of Central Córdoba de Santiago del Estero.

See also
 List of football stadiums in Argentina

References

Alfredo Terrera
Buildings and structures in Santiago del Estero Province
Sport in Santiago del Estero Province